Tarakasura also rendered as Tharakasuran (Tamil: தாரக்காசுரன்) and Tarakasura is a powerful asura in Hindu mythology. He is the son of the asura Vajranga and his wife Vajrangi. Taraka had three sons: Tarakaksha, Vidyunmali, and Kamalaksha, who were known as the Tripurasura. He is known to be slain by Kartikeya.

Birth 
Diti, ever jealous of her sister Aditi, asked for her consort Kashyapa to provide her a son who would be capable of defeating the devas, who were the sons of Aditi. Consenting, Kashyapa granted his wife Vajranga, possessing adamantine limbs, who performed her bidding by capturing Indra and the devas and punishing them. When Aditi protested, Brahma urged Vajranga to release his captives, who acquiesced, stating that he had only done what his mother had instructed. Pleased, Brahma created a wife for him known as Vajrangi, who was both alluring and loving. When he offered her a boon, she asked him to grant her a son who would capture the three worlds, and cause misery to Vishnu. Dumbstruck, he performed a penance to Brahma to grant him a good son, who was born as Tarakasura.

Boon 
Taraka performed penance to Brahma, and when the creator appeared, asked for two boons: One, that none shall be his equal in all of the three worlds, and two, that only a son of Shiva could slay him. This second desire was considered to be crafty on his part, since Shiva was a yogi and was unlikely to bear children. His wish granted, Tarakasura promptly overran Svarga, expelling the devas just like his father had, but now declaring himself to be the new Indra. Indra approached Brahma and demanded that he assist him, since it was the latter's fault for granting whatever boons his devotees sought. Brahma explained to him that he could not do much, considering that Shiva was engaged in a deep tapas and would hardly notice Parvati, the daughter of Himavan who sought him as her consort. Indra devised a scheme with Kamadeva and Rati, who attempted to disrupt Shiva and beguile him with thoughts of love, accompanied by dancing apsaras and music. When Kamadeva shot his floral arrow at Shiva, he felt a powerful surge of attraction towards Parvati, but then observed the scheming Kamadeva and burnt him to ash. Parvati performed severe tapas in order to finally win the affection of Shiva and married him with great pomp, giving birth to Kartikeya, the son of Shiva destined to slay Taraka.

Battle against Skanda 
According to the Skanda Purana, Kartikeya (Skanda) was appointed as the commander of the gods, charged with his destiny of vanquishing the asura. The divinities offered a number of gifts to empower him. Taraka, the king of the daityas, summoned billions of asuras to defend his realm, his forces commanded by Kalanemi. The asuras gained the upper hand, the armies of the devas falling like trees to a forest fire. Indra was struck down. Hearing Kalanemi's contempt, Kartikeya and Krishna arrived to duel him, the latter wielding his great bow and raining arrows on the asura from atop Garuda. Kalanemi responded by swallowing Krishna and Garuda whole, after which the deity sliced the asura's belly open with the Sudarshana Chakra, the celestial weapon cutting down masses of daitya warriors. Observing Taraka, Krishna spoke to Kartikeya:

 

Kartikeya ignored Taraka's words of condescension and battled him, hurling his terrible shakti on the asuras. When the miraculous missile was thrown by Skanda of unmeasured splendour, excessively terrible clusters of meteors fell on the earth. A million missiles of shakti fell out from it, a thousand million vehicles being struck down. When Krishna urged him to hurl his shakti against Taraka, Skanda hesitated, observing that his foe was a devotee of Rudra. Krishna then manipulated Taraka into attacking Shiva. 

Nevertheless, Taraka proved to be equal to all of their prowess combined, roaring triumphantly. Krishna laughed scornfully, loudly, musing that had he known that Skanda would not slay a devotee of Rudra, the devas and he would not have seen such destruction. Assuming his form of Vishnu, he wrung his arms and swore to kill all the asuras, charging against them and killing a billion of them even as he ran. The earth shook and the devas grew terrified. The gandharva Siddha urged Vishnu to think about his actions that threatened the entire universe. Reverting to his form as Krishna, Skanda and he charged towards Taraka, upon which they witnessed a woman emerging out of the latter's head. The woman announced that she was Shakti, who had resided in the asura ever since his great penance, but would now forsake him because his adharma had out-balanced his dharma. Kartikeya seized the Shakti and pierced it against Taraka's heart, finally fulfilling his destiny even as the deities hailed his name.

Literary references
This story is the basis for the epic Kumarasambhava (lit., birth of Kartikeya) by Kalidasa (c. 4th century CE).  The theme of the vaporised love spirit roaming free in the universe was adopted by the Vaishnavas (c. 16th century) who believe it was reincarnated in Vasudeva. This is also the theme of the poem madanbhasmer par (মদনভস্মের পর) by Rabindranath Tagore.

See also
Kartikeya

References

Daityas